Tuesday Morning is an American discount store company.

Tuesday Morning may also refer to:

"Tuesday Morning" (song), a 1993 song by The Pogues
"Tuesday Morning", a song by Melissa Etheridge from Lucky
"Tuesday Morning", a song by Michelle Branch from Hotel Paper
Tuesday Morning Quarterback, a column written by Gregg Easterbrook